Fabrice Jeannet (born 20 October 1980 in Fort-de-France, Martinique) is a retired French épée fencer.

Jeannet won the gold medal in the épée team event at the 2004 and 2008 Summer Olympics and a silver medal in the individual épée in 2008.  He was also a member of the French team that won the 2006 World Fencing Championships after beating Spain in the final. He accomplished this with his teammates Ulrich Robeiri, Gauthier Grumier and Érik Boisse.

His brother, Jérôme Jeannet is a fencer too.

References

1980 births
Living people
Sportspeople from Fort-de-France
Martiniquais fencers
French male épée fencers
Fencers at the 2004 Summer Olympics
Fencers at the 2008 Summer Olympics
Olympic fencers of France
Olympic gold medalists for France
Olympic silver medalists for France
Olympic medalists in fencing
French people of Martiniquais descent
Medalists at the 2008 Summer Olympics
Officers of the Ordre national du Mérite
Medalists at the 2004 Summer Olympics